Saint Luke or Luke the Evangelist, one of the Four Evangelists.

Saint Luke may also refer to:

Art
 Saint Luke (Giambologna), a  1600 bronze statue of Luke the Evangelist by Giambologna
 Saint Luke (El Greco), a  1610 painting by an artist known as El Greco
 St Luke (Hals), a 1625 painting by Frans Hals
 St. Luke (Notre Dame sculpture), a 1957 sculpture by Ivan Meštrović

Places
 Saint Luke, Virginia, an unincorporated community in Shenandoah County, in the U.S. state of Virginia
 St. Luke's Hospital (disambiguation)
 Saint Luke Institute, Silver Spring, Maryland, US
 Saint Luke Parish, Dominica, an administrative parish
 Saint Luke's Tower, a skyscraper located in Chūō, Tokyo, Japan

Other uses
 Gospel of Luke, tells of the origins, birth, ministry, death, resurrection, and ascension of Jesus Christ
 Guild of Saint Luke, the painters' and artists' guild in Medieval Europe
 Order of Saint Luke, a religious order begun within the Methodist Church in the United States

See also
 Saint-Luc (disambiguation)
 Saint Lucas (disambiguation)
 St. Luke's (disambiguation)
 San Luca, an Italian village
 San Lucas (disambiguation)